KF Velebit is a Swedish football club located in Göteborg.

Background
Kroatiska Föreningen Velebit were founded in 1962, but were not formally registered until 15 January 1964 when the football section of the club started. Velebit is the name of the largest mountain range in Croatia and this title was chosen to symbolise stability, grandeur and strength. During their first season membership comprised mostly young men in their 20s, who came to Sweden as the first wave of labour migrants from Croatia.  The focus of the club has changed as time has progressed and new sections and activities have been added with the common thread of preserving of Croatian culture and language.  A key addition was made in 1986 with the completion of a clubhouse.

Today the club has around 1,100 members supported by 20 sections.  KF Velebit remains a place where everyone is made to feel welcome, all ages, men and women, Swedes, Croats and other nationalities.

Since their foundation KF Velebit has participated mainly in the middle and lower divisions of the Swedish football league system.  The club currently plays in Division 3 Nordvästra Götaland which is the fifth tier of Swedish football. They play their home matches at the Velebit IP in Göteborg.

KF Velebit are affiliated to Göteborgs Fotbollförbund.

Recent history
In recent seasons KF Velebit have competed in the following divisions:

2011 – Division III, Nordvästra Götaland
2010 – Division IV, Göteborg B
2009 – Division IV, Göteborg B
2008 – Division IV, Göteborg B
2007 – Division IV, Göteborg B
2006 – Division III, Nordvästra Götaland
2005 – Division III, Nordvästra Götaland
2004 – Division III, Nordvästra Götaland
2003 – Division III, Nordvästra Götaland
2002 – Division III, Nordvästra Götaland
2001 – Division IV, Göteborg B
2000 – Division IV, Göteborg B
1999 – Division IV, Göteborg B

Attendances

In recent seasons KF Velebit have had the following average attendances:

Footnotes

External links
 KF Velebit – Official website
 KF Velebit – First team website
 KF Velebit Göteborg on Facebook

Football clubs in Gothenburg
Association football clubs established in 1962
1962 establishments in Sweden
Football clubs in Västra Götaland County